Tichonice is a municipality and village in Benešov District in the Central Bohemian Region of the Czech Republic. It has about 200 inhabitants.

Administrative parts
Villages and hamlets of Chochol, Kácovec, Kácovská Lhota, Pelíškův Most and Soušice are administrative parts of Tichonice.

History
The first written mention of Tichonice is from 1365.

References

Villages in Benešov District